Steve Whitehead is a British painter, born in Coventry, England in 1960.

He studied at the Aberystwyth University, with David Tinker, graduating with an MA in Fine Art in the mid-1980s, before continuing his studies at the Courtauld Institute of Art in London.

Whitehead is predominantly a landscape painter, although he also produces figure compositions. His art is sometimes described as a form of Photorealism, although according to the art critic Michael Paraskos it is more like a Poetic Realism, as Whitehead does not simply reproduce photographs in paint, but creates composite images, drawing on many photographs and historic art images. In particular, Whitehead's art is influenced by the landscape traditions of northern European romantics, such as Caspar David Friedrich, and the realism of the Biedermeier realist painters.

He has twice won the Wales Open and has also been a prizewinner in Manchester Academy and Hunting Art Prizes exhibitions. His paintings are held in the permanent collection of the Contemporary Art Society of Wales. He previously taught Fine Art at the University of Hull and is a regular visiting artist at the Cyprus College of Art. He is represented by the Plus One Gallery in London, and the Modern Artists Gallery in  Berkshire.

Whitehead is the subject of a book by the art critic Michael Paraskos published in 2008.

References

1960 births
Living people
20th-century British artists
21st-century British artists
Artists from Coventry
Alumni of Aberystwyth University
Alumni of the Courtauld Institute of Art